Gregory or Greg Martin may refer to:

Gregory Martin (scholar) (c. 1542–1582), Catholic Priest, scholar, and Bible translator
Gregory Martin (wrestler), professional wrestler, see MCW Cruiserweight Championship
Greg Martin (entrepreneur), entrepreneur and cyber security expert
Sir Greg Martin, London, executive headteacher
Gregory J. Martin, American medical doctor and U.S. Navy captain
Gregory Paul Martin (born 1957), British actor
Gregory S. Martin (born 1948), USAF general
Greg Martin (rugby union) (born 1963), Australian rugby union player
Greg Martin, American actor and assistant director featured in The Great Waldo Pepper and Berks 
Greg Martin (musician), singer and guitarist with The Kentucky Headhunters